David de la Cruz Melgarejo (born 6 May 1989) is a Spanish cyclist, who currently rides for UCI WorldTeam .

Career
De la Cruz was born in Sabadell. On 28 August 2016, de la Cruz scored the biggest win of his career to that point, when he won stage 9 of the Vuelta a España from a breakaway and took over the general and combination classification jerseys. He went on to finish the race in seventh place overall. For these accomplishments he was voted as the best sportsperson of his hometown, Sabadell, in 2016. In the 2020 Vuelta a España he again finished the race in seventh place overall, and also finished seventh in 2021.

Major results

2009
 9th Overall Vuelta Ciclista a León
2010
 9th Overall Vuelta Ciclista a León
2011
 2nd Toscana-Terra di Ciclismo
2012
 2nd Overall Vuelta a Asturias
 4th Overall Vuelta a Castilla y León
 5th Overall Volta a Portugal
1st  Young rider classification
 9th Overall Vuelta a la Comunidad de Madrid
2014
 10th Overall Tour of California
2016
 7th Overall Vuelta a España
1st Stage 9
Held  &  after Stage 9
2017
 1st Stage 8 Paris–Nice
 3rd Overall Vuelta a Burgos
 4th Overall Tour of the Basque Country
1st Stage 3
 7th Overall Volta a la Comunitat Valenciana
2018
 1st Stage 5 (ITT) Vuelta a Andalucía
 3rd Overall Vuelta a Burgos
 9th Overall Paris–Nice
1st Stage 8
 9th Overall Tour of the Basque Country
2019
 5th Overall Settimana Internazionale di Coppi e Bartali
 8th Overall Tour of Guangxi
 8th Overall Vuelta a Burgos
  Combativity award Stage 8 Vuelta a España
2020
 1st  Mountains classification, Critérium du Dauphiné
 7th Overall Vuelta a España
 8th Overall Vuelta a Burgos
2021
 2nd Time trial, National Road Championships
 4th Overall Tour de Luxembourg
 5th Overall Vuelta a Burgos
 7th Overall Vuelta a España
2022
 10th Overall UAE Tour
 10th Overall Volta a la Comunitat Valenciana
2023
 8th Overall O Gran Camiño

Grand Tour general classification results timeline

References

External links

 

1989 births
Living people
Cyclists from Catalonia
Spanish male cyclists
Spanish Vuelta a España stage winners
Sportspeople from Sabadell
21st-century Spanish people